Alex Michael Reid (born 6 September 1995) is an English professional footballer who plays as a striker for Oldham Athletic.

Reid began his career at Aston Villa's academy before becoming an apprentice at Walsall. He joined Swedish club Ånge IF in 2014, before returning to England to play for Solihull Moors in 2015. He then joined Rushall Olympic of the Northern Premier League and spent a year-and-a-half there. Following a successful trial, Reid signed for League One club Fleetwood Town in January 2017. During his time at Fleetwood, he was loaned out to National League clubs in the form of Wrexham and former employers Solihull Moors throughout the 2017–18 season. Reid signed for Stevenage in July 2018. He spent the last three months of the 2018–19 season on loan at AFC Fylde and helped the club to win the FA Trophy during his time there.

Career

Early career
Reid began his career at Aston Villa at the age of ten and remained at the club's academy until 2013. He subsequently joined Walsall's academy later that year and spent one year as an apprentice at the West Midlands club. Reid thought about quitting football after not being offered professional terms at Walsall, but instead took up the League Football Education's Player Placement Programme in Sweden, joining Ånge IF in 2014. He returned to England a year later and had spells at Solihull Moors and Rushall Olympic.

Fleetwood Town and loan spells
Having scored 14 times during the first half of the 2016–17 season for Rushall, Reid went on trial with League One club Fleetwood Town in December 2016. The trial period proved successful and he signed for Fleetwood for an undisclosed fee on 4 January 2017. Reid did not make any first-team appearances for Fleetwood during the remainder of the campaign, spending it with the club's development squad.

Reid joined Wrexham of the National League on a two-month loan deal on 15 August 2017. He made his Wrexham debut on the same day his signing was announced, coming on as a 59th-minute substitute and scoring the only goal of the game in a 1–0 home win over Gateshead. Having scored three times during the two-month loan spell, the deal was extended until 25 November 2017. He made 18 appearances during his time on loan at Wrexham, scoring three goals. On his return to his parent club, Reid made his Fleetwood debut in the EFL Trophy against Chesterfield on 5 December 2017, scoring the second goal in a 2–0 victory in what turned out to be his solitary first-team appearance for the club.

He was loaned out for a second time during the season, this time joining former club Solihull Moors of the National League. Reid signed for Solihull on 1 February 2018, on a loan deal that ran for the remainder of the 2017–18 campaign. He made his second debut for Solihull in a 1–0 away loss to Ebbsfleet United on 10 February 2018, before scoring his first goal of the loan spell a week later in a 3–2 comeback victory over Dover Athletic. Reid's second-half goal in Solihull's 2–1 away win against promotion-chasing Tranmere Rovers on 24 April 2018 meant that Solihull had guaranteed their place in the National League for another season. He scored four times in 15 appearances during the loan spell before returning to Fleetwood upon the conclusion of the season.

Stevenage
Whilst still contracted to Fleetwood, Reid went on trial at League Two club Stevenage in July 2018. He subsequently signed for Stevenage on a free transfer on 19 July 2018. Reid made his Stevenage debut in the club's opening match of the 2018–19 season, a 2–2 draw with Tranmere Rovers at Broadhall Way, playing the first 58 minutes of the match.

Reid joined National League club AFC Fylde on loan for the rest of the season on 8 February 2019. In August 2019 he moved on loan to Ebbsfleet United. He said he was looking forward to playing games and scoring goals for the club.

On 17 January 2020 he joined National League side Dagenham & Redbridge on loan until the end of the season. The season was ultimately cut short due to Covid-19 and Reid was released by Stevenage in the summer of 2020.

Stockport County
In July 2020, he signed a contract with National League side Stockport County. He returned to Solihull Moors on loan on 30 June 2022.

Oldham Athletic
He was released by Stockport in November 2022, signing for Oldham Athletic.

Style of play
Reid was described as "strong and athletic", as well as "having an eye for goal" by Fleetwood Town development coach Paul Murray. Stevenage manager Dino Maamria called Reid a "pure athlete" and stated that "he will add pace to our forward-line".

Career statistics

Honours
AFC Fylde
FA Trophy: 2018–19

Stockport County
National League: 2021–22

References

1995 births
Living people
English footballers
Association football forwards
Aston Villa F.C. players
Walsall F.C. players
Ånge IF players
Solihull Moors F.C. players
Rushall Olympic F.C. players
Fleetwood Town F.C. players
Wrexham A.F.C. players
Stevenage F.C. players
AFC Fylde players
Ebbsfleet United F.C. players
Dagenham & Redbridge F.C. players
Stockport County F.C. players
Northern Premier League players
National League (English football) players
English Football League players
Oldham Athletic A.F.C. players